Amboise station (French: Gare d'Amboise) is a railway station serving the town Amboise, Indre-et-Loire department, central France. It is situated on the Paris–Bordeaux railway.

Services

The station is served by regional trains (TER Centre-Val de Loire) to Tours, Blois and Orléans.

See also 

 List of SNCF stations in Centre-Val de Loire

References

Railway stations in Indre-et-Loire
Railway stations in France opened in 1846